John Strother Pendleton (March 1, 1802 – November 19, 1868), nicknamed "The Lone Star", was a nineteenth-century congressman, diplomat, lawyer and farmer from Virginia.

Early and family life
Born near Culpeper, Virginia, Pendleton studied with private tutors and at Cloverdale Academy, then read law. He married Lucy Ann Williams, the daughter of James and Elizabeth Bruce Williams, on December 2, 1824, at "Soldiers Rest" in Orange County, Virginia. During the 1820s, he resided at the Slaughter-Hill House, listed on the National Register of Historic Places in 1989. The two had no biological children, but adopted Lucy's brother Philip's son, George Morton Williams, when he was three years old.

Career
After admission to the Virginia bar in 1824, Pendleton began his legal practice in Culpeper County, Virginia. Culpeper's voters elected Pendleton as their representative to the Virginia House of Delegates from 1831 to 1833, and not long after Rappahannock County, Virginia was created from part of Culpeper County, Rappahannock County voters selected him to represent them from 1836 to 1839.

President John Tyler, a fellow Whig from Virginia, appointed Pendleton Chargé d'Affaires to Chile in 1841, and he served until 1844 when he was elected a Whig to the United States House of Representatives. He was re-elected once, and served from 1845 to 1849. In the House, Pendleton obtained the nickname "The Lone Star" because he was the only Whig from Virginia.

Pendleton returned to his diplomatic career, as President Millard Fillmore appointed him Chargé d'Affaires to the Argentine Confederation in 1851. He served until 1854 and in 1852 also served as Minister to Brazil with Robert C. Schenck to negotiate a treaty of commerce with Paraguay and Uruguay.

Pendleton returned to the United States and engaged in farming, but his estate was devastated by the American Civil War, particularly the Battle of Cedar Mountain, such that he appeared before General Banks for permission to leave the county. However, by March 1863, he was able to extend hospitality to Confederate officers at his estate, "Redwood", after a St. Patrick's Day Party, although several would die in battles the following days including at Kelly's Ford.

Death and legacy

Pendleton survived the war and died on November 19, 1868, near Culpeper, Virginia. He was interred in the family cemetery at "Redwood" in Culpeper.

References

1802 births
1868 deaths
Members of the Virginia House of Delegates
Virginia lawyers
Farmers from Virginia
Ambassadors of the United States to Argentina
Ambassadors of the United States to Chile
People from Culpeper, Virginia
19th-century American diplomats
Whig Party members of the United States House of Representatives from Virginia
19th-century American politicians
19th-century American lawyers
Pendleton family